Alfred Randolph Fenwick (26 March 1891–1979) was an English footballer who played in the Football League for Ashington, Coventry City, Hull City and West Ham United.

References

1890s births
1975 deaths
English footballers
Association football midfielders
English Football League players
Craghead United F.C. players
Hull City A.F.C. players
West Ham United F.C. players
Coventry City F.C. players
Blyth Spartans A.F.C. players
Ashington A.F.C. players
Halifax Town A.F.C. players
Bedlington United A.F.C. players